John James Hemphill (August 25, 1849 – May 11, 1912) was a U.S. Representative from South Carolina, cousin of William Huggins Brawley, nephew of John Hemphill and great-uncle of Robert Witherspoon Hemphill.

Born in Chester, South Carolina, Hemphill attended the public schools and was graduated from the University of South Carolina at Columbia in 1869.
He studied law.
He was admitted to the bar in 1870 and practiced in Chester, South Carolina.
He was an unsuccessful candidate for the State legislature in 1874.
He served as member of the State house of representatives 1876-1882.

Hemphill was elected as a Democrat to the Forty-eighth and to the four succeeding Congresses (March 4, 1883 – March 3, 1893).
He served as chairman of the Committee on District of Columbia (Fiftieth and Fifty-second Congresses).
He was an unsuccessful candidate for reelection in 1892 to the Fifty-third Congress.
He resumed the practice of law in Washington, D.C., while retaining his residence in South Carolina.
He was an unsuccessful candidate for election as United States Senator from South Carolina in 1902.
He died in Washington, D.C., May 11, 1912.
He was interred in Oak Hill Cemetery in Washington, D.C.

Sources

External links

1849 births
1912 deaths
Burials at Oak Hill Cemetery (Washington, D.C.)
Democratic Party members of the United States House of Representatives from South Carolina
19th-century American politicians
University of South Carolina alumni